Changaramkulam (IAST: Caṅṅaraṅkuḷaṁ) is a town in Ponnani taluk of Malappuram district in the Indian state of Kerala. It falls on, and is shared across two panchayats—Nannammukku and Alamcode. Changaramkulam is under Ponnani Lokhsabha Constituency.

Economy
Changaramkulam is one of the prominent public markets. It was known for its weekly cattle, areca nut and food markets. Changaramkulam is situated in south side of Malappuram District, and just 5 km Distance to both Thrissur and Palakkad districts. The Kerala State Highway 69 (Thrissur Kuttipuram Road) is passing through Changaramkulam Town.

Major roads from Changaramkulam Town are:

 Thrissur–Calicut Highway
 Changaramkulam–Naranippuzha Road (from Changaramkulam to Eramangalam: ends at  Guruvayoor–Ponnani Road. Easy to access Mookkuthala, Eramangalam, Maranchery, Puthanpally, Guruvayoor & Ponnani)
 Changaramkulam–Cheruvalloor Road (from Changaramkulam To Cheruvalloor: ends at Guruvayoor–Ponnani Road. Easy To Access Nannammukku, Uppungal kadavu, Punnayoorkkulam, Althara, Vadakkekad, Guruvayoor)
 Changaramkulam-Nannammukku Road (from Changaramkulam To Nannammukku: ends at Srayikkadav-Chirakkal Road. Easy To Access Nannammukku, Srayikkadavu, Kattakampal, Chirakkal, Pazhanji, Porkulam, Kunnamkulam)

Recent developments
Nowadays Changaramkulam has gained a lot of developments. The town has almost all major banks, hospital, schools, colleges, etc.
The town comes under Changaramkulam Police Station ( Ponnani Circle – Tirur Dysp Office ).

Alamcode Village Office Changaramkulam
Alamcode Grama Panchayath Office Changaramkulam
BSNL Office Changaramkulam
KSEB Office Changaramkulam
Changaramkulam Police Station
Agriculture Office Alamcode (Krishi Bhavan) Changaramkulam
Alamcode Veterinary Office Changaramkulam
Sunrise Hospital (old Arafa Hospital) Changaramkulam
Mother & Child Hospital Changaramkulam
New India Insurance Portal Office Changaramkulam 9072 133 133
Reliance General Insurance Office Changaramkulam 9746 222 007
HDFC Ergo General Insurance Office Changaramkulam 9746 222 007

Education
Schools & Colleges
PCNGHSS - Mookkuthala
MVM RHSS - Valayamkulam
Darussalam - Changaramkulam
SM College - Changaramkulam
Assabah Arabic College - Pavittappuram
Nannamukku Technical High School - Kokkur
Assabah Arts & Science College Valayamkulam
Darul Ihsan Islamic & Arts College Punnakkal Changaramkulam

Lessonlens global school valayamkulam

Transportation
Changaramkulam village connects to other parts of India through Kuttippuram town.  National Highway No.66 passes through Edappal and the northern stretch connects to Goa and Mumbai.  The southern stretch connects to Cochin and Trivandrum.   National Highway No.966 connects to Palakkad and Coimbatore.  The nearest airports are at Kozhikode & Kochin International Airport.  The nearest major railway stations are at Kuttippuram and Guruvayoor.

If one heads south they'll enter Thrissur District and pass Perumbilav and Kunnamkulam. And taking left from there can reach Thrissur.

References

Cities and towns in Malappuram district
Kuttippuram area

http://gridtiesolar.in

www.facebook.com/changaramkulam1